The Devil, (Satan, Lucifer, Beelzebub, Mephistopheles) appears frequently as a character in literature and various other media. In Abrahamic religions, the figure of the Devil, Satan personifies evil.

A devil (lower case) is an "evil spirit, demon, fiend" (OED).

Entertainment

Music

Classical music
The Devil is featured as a character in many musical representations from the Middle Ages to modern times. Hildegard of Bingen's 11th-century Ordo Virtutum features him, as do several baroque oratorios by composers such as Carissimi and Alessandro Scarlatti. During the 19th century, Gounod's Faust, in which the Devil goes by the name Mephistopheles, was a staple of opera houses around the world.

Highly virtuosic violin music was sometimes associated with the Devil. Tartini's Devil's Trill sonata and Paganini's Devil's Laughter caprice are examples. The theme is taken up by Stravinsky in the "Devil's Dance" from The Soldier's Tale.

Other pieces that refer to the Devil are Franz Liszt's "Mephisto Walzer" and Joseph Hellmsberger II's "Teufelstanz", as well as Haydn's lost opera "Der krumme Teufel".

"Archangel of Light" (another name for Lucifer) is a title song of the classical music band with the same name, by the composer Carlos David López Grether

Popular music
Jazz was often called the Devil's music by its critics in the 1920s. 
The Rolling Stones' "Sympathy for the Devil" (1968) features Mick Jagger speaking as the Devil.
"The Devil Went Down to Georgia" (1979) by the Charlie Daniels Band was the first modern popular song to feature a battle between the devil and a musician. The theme of battling the devil has been revisited several times in other songs.
Black metal is a subgenre of heavy metal that is commonly associated with the devil for its use of anti-Christian lyrics and symbols commonly associated with Satanism, such as the pentagram and inverted cross. 
"N.I.B." by Black Sabbath is a song about "the Devil falling in love and totally changing becoming a good person." (Geezer Butler, 1992 documentary The Black Sabbath Story: Volume One)  The song's chorus references Lucifer specifically: "..Look into my eyes, you will see who I am; My name is Lucifer, please take my hand."
"Lucifer" is the name of a song by U.S. rapper Jay-Z from his 2003 album, The Black Album.
The Moonspell song "Dreamless (Lilith and Lucifer)" is about a romantic relationship between Lucifer and the demoness Lilith.
The Swedish death metal band Kaamos has an album called Lucifer Rising.  There is also an album of the same name by doom metal band Candlemass.
The band Inkubus Sukkubus has a song entitled "Lucifer Rising".
The final song on the Behemoth album Evangelion is called "Lucifer".
Though not directly named, Lucifer is referenced in many of the horror punk/deathrock supergroup Son of Sam songs, particularly 'Michael' on Songs from the Earth.
Korean boyband SHINee released a song in 2010 called "Lucifer".
Composer Mort Garson used the pseudonym Lucifer for his 1971 Black Mass album.
Lucifer and Lewis "Cypher" are pseudonyms used since 1993 by Duncan Lewis Jowitt for solo releases, including the 10-minute orchestral "Symphony For The Devil" (2014).
Rapper/hip-hop artist Immortal Technique's song "Dance With the Devil" from his Revolutionary Vol. 1 album (2001) is well known and deemed one of the greatest "story telling" rap songs of all time.
Cyprus entered the Eurovision Song Contest 2021 with the song "El Diablo". The song's meaning was described as about "falling in love with someone as bad as the devil".

Film and television
When Satan is depicted in movies and television, he is often represented as a red-skinned man with horns or pointed ears on his head, hooves or bird-legs, a forked tail (or one with a stinger), and a pitchfork. When trying to blend in or deceive somebody, he is often represented as an ordinary human being, and sometimes only his voice is heard.

Film
Satan as a personification of evil provides many narrative opportunities. Struggles with Satan have been used to symbolize human weaknesses and temptations, as in the films Bedazzled (1967, remade 2000) and Oh, God! You Devil (1984). In horror and suspense films, Satan provides for a virtually all-powerful foe.

Television

Animation

The Devil has been a popular recurring character in many animated films, either theatrical shorts, animated TV series and/or in anime. When a character has to take a moral choice a tiny-sized angel and devil often appear on both sides of his shoulders, representing the two possible choices he can take: the "good" path or the "bad" one. 
Demon-like characters have been featured as an occasional character in several animated series, either under the name Satan or as the Devil. When the Hays Code censorship was still in effect between the mid-1930s to the mid-1960s the Devil sometimes went nameless or received a different name referring to diabolical characters from other mythologies to avoid offending religious viewers. Examples of this practice are for instance Chernobog in Fantasia or the description of Hell as Hades in the Looney Tunes short Satan's Waitin' (1954). Even though these demons and their environment were not specifically identified as Satan and Hell, viewers still would make the connection based on the visual representation. Another way to avoid connotations with Satan was to make the demonic character an anthropomorphic cartoon animal.

Anime and manga
 The Devil Is a Part-Timer! (はたらく魔王さま!, Hataraku Maō-sama!); the main protagonist of anime and manga series is Satan Jacob ("Sadao Maou"). Lucifer also appears in the series as a separate character.
 Black Clover (ブラッククローバー, Burakku Kurōbā); Devils are an ancient race of magical and malevolent beings that dwell in the Underworld and serve as major antagonists of the series. As they originate from the Underworld, their mana are sinister in nature, giving rise to demonic magic attributes that are superior to their ordinary counterparts. Most devils are animalistic and monstrous in appearance and behavior, though higher ranking devils are more humanoid and intelligent.
Supreme Devils/Highest-ranking Devils of the Tree of Qliphoth are based on and share the names of demons and devils in real world mythology.
The Supreme Devil of the first layer of the Underworld are the twins Lilith and Nahamah/Naamah, who are wielders of Demon Ice Magic and Demon Fire Magic respectively.
The Supreme Devil of the second layer of the Underworld is Adrammelech, who has supposedly betrayed the King of Devils by stealing his heart.
In the lowest layer resides the three rulers of the Underworld: Beelzebub, the devil of Spatial Magic, Astaroth, the devil of Time Magic, and finally, the King of Devils, Lucifero, the devil of Gravity Magic.
 Blue Exorcist Lucifer is one of the Eight Demon Kings and also the strongest among all of them in the story. He is also the leader of the group 'Illuminati', which researches immortality to find a way to create a strong host for Lucifer to possess.
 Demon Lord Dante (魔王ダンテ, Maō Dante), Demon Lord Satan helps Dante in his battle against God and his angels.
 Devilman, Satan, an angel who formerly served God, defects to the side of the demons and leads a war against his old master, but loses. As part of a plan to resume the war in the future, he has his memories suppressed and his army frozen in ice. After having his memories suppressed, he assumes the identity of a young man named Ryo Asuka, who leads Akira Fudo on the route to becoming a Devilman.
 Digimon, known as Lucemon and one of the franchise's Seven Great Demon Lords, is based upon Lucifer; this character's backstory is similar to Lucifer's fall from grace. Digimon possesses numerous forms of increasing power, including his Chaos/Falldown Mode, Shadow Lord/Satan mode, and Larva Mode.
 High School DxD Devils are a supernatural species of demons spawn from Lilith, the wife of the Devil King Lucifer. The Devils were ruled by their kings Lucifer, Beelzebub, Leviathan and Asmodeus. Desiring world domination, the Devil Kings led the devils to fought in Armageddon against God, Angels and Fallen Angels which lead to their deaths, countless devils also died to the point they became an endangered species.
Lucifer is one of the four original Devil Kings who ruled the Devils and died in Armageddon against God, Angels and Fallen Angels. His cambion great grandson Vali Lucifer is the archrival of the protagonist Issei Hyodou. His son Rizevim Livian Lucifer whom he sired with Adam's ex-wife, Lilith became one of the main antagonists of the series, who sought to invade another world by reviving the Beast of Revelation using the Devil technology Lucifer had left behind, causing immense chaos to the world greater than what his father the original Lucifer had originally planned for world domination.
Beelzebub is one of the four original Devil Kings who ruled the Devils and died in Armageddon against God, Angels and Fallen Angels. His son, Bidleid Bashalun Beelzebub who inherited his father's arrogance also desired world domination, had tried to restart Armageddon but was killed by Sirzechs Gremory in the Devil Civil War. Another of Beelzebub's descendants, Shalba became one of the main antagonists as he also desired world domination by joining the supernatural terrorist organization the Khaos Bridgade. After being defeated by Issei, Shalba went insane as he sought to destroyed the Underworld and all Devils for denying him as their true ruler. 
 Beelzebub (manga); The Devil King's child is watched over by the Tatsumi Oga until he is old enough to rule Hell.
Mobile Fighter G Gundam The word, "Devil" was used on the Devil Gundam, which the name is changed to "Dark Gundam" in the English Dub, due to Sunrise's fears about Christian-related/Bible references, since the God Gundam was changed into "Burning Gundam".
In Yu-Gi-Oh! Duel Monsters, Zorc Necrophades the Dark One/Yami Bakura, was resurrected by combining the Millennium Items back together, which even resembles a demon of Hell, (in the English dub, he is the creator and ruler of the inter-dimensional Shadow Realm) and it had a Dragon Head on its crotch.
In the manga of The Betrayal Knows My Name, Lucifer was/is the ancient demon king and the most feared and strongest of the duras whose tremendous demonic powers and strength was secretly coveted by the ancestors of the Giou Clan who desired to control it but failed. The anime "concludes"  before the discovery of Lucifer.
In Soul Cartel, Lucifer was the former Archangel that fell and became the very first Fallen Angel. When Lucifer was slayed by Michael, he split into 4 parts ( Mephistopheles, Beelzebub, Mastema, and Astaroth ), creating the 4 Archdevils. Further in the series Mephistopheles the first archdevil summoned Lucifer's alter ego Asmodeus to fight an enemy.
In Beyblade Burst, 4 characters use devil-themed beys; Silas Karlisie, in the second and fifth seasons (Satan/Satomb); Delta Zakuro, in the fourth season (Diabolos/Devolos); Lain Valhalla, the main antagonist of the fifth season (Lucifer/Lucius) and Bel Daizora, the main protagonist of the sixth and final season (Belial/Belfyre).
 In Record of Ragnarok Beelzebub is an eighth round fighter, he is the representative of the gods team. Satan and Beelzebub are different characters, but they both share the same body (in this case, Beelzebub's). Lucifer, Samael and Azazel are figures from Beelzebub's past.

Radio

The BBC Radio 4 comedy show Old Harry's Game features Andy Hamilton in the leading role as Satan; in the first episode of Series Six, Satan states that he has gone by many names over the centuries including Beelzebub, Mephistopheles, Old Nick, Old Harry and Simon Cowell (one of his Satanic guises).

David Suchet played Satan in a radio adaptation of the play The Devil's Passion by Justin Butcher, broadcast on 3 December 2017.

Trevor Spencer voices Lucifer in the BBV Productions series Hellscape (created as well by Trevor Spencer) which is part of the extended Faction Paradox & Doctor Who universe.

Literature

Many writers have incorporated the character of Satan into their works. Among them are, in chronological order:
 

Dante Alighieri's Inferno (1321) 	
Christopher Marlowe's Doctor Faustus (1604) 	
Joost van den Vondel's Lucifer (1654) 	
John Milton's Paradise Lost (1667) 	
Alain-René Lesage's The Devil on Two Sticks (1707) 
Jacques Cazotte's The Devil in Love (Le Diable amoureux) (1772) 	
William Beckford's Vathek
William Blake's The Marriage of Heaven and Hell (1790–1793)
Matthew Lewis The Monk (1796)
The Brothers Grimm's The Smith and the Devil (1812)
Johann Wolfgang Goethe's Faust (Part 1, 1808; Part 2, 1832)
James Hogg's The Private Memoirs and Confessions of a Justified Sinner (1824)
Alexander Pushkin's A scene from Faust (1830)
Edward Bulwer-Lytton's Asmodeus At Large (1833)
Nathaniel Hawthorne's Young Goodman Brown (1835)
Mikhail Lermontov's The Devil (1842)
Nathaniel Hawthorne's The Scarlet Letter (1850)
Charles Baudelaire's Litanies of Satan (1857)
Imre Madách's The Tragedy of Man (1862)
Jules Michelet's  Satanism and Witchcraft (1862)
Giosuè Carducci's Hymn to Satan (1865) 	
Henrik Ibsen's Peer Gynt (1867)
Gustave Flaubert's The Temptation of Saint Anthony (1874)
Fyodor Dostoyevsky's The Brothers Karamazov (1880)
Robert Louis Stevenson's Markheim (1885)
Leo Tolstoy's  How Much Land Does a Man Need? (1886)
Mark Twain's A Pen Warmed Up in Hell (1889)
Joris-Karl Huysmans's Là-bas (1891)
Marie Corelli's  The Sorrows of Satan (1896)
Robert Buchanan's  The Devil's Case (1896)
George Bernard Shaw's The Devil's Disciple (1901)
George Bernard Shaw's Man and Superman (1903)
Ferenc Molnár's The Devil (play) (1907)
Mark Twain's Letters from the Earth (1909)
Aleister Crowley's Hymn to Satan (1913)
Anatole France's The Revolt of the Angels (1914)
Mark Twain's The Mysterious Stranger (1916)
James Branch Cabell's Jurgen, A Comedy of Justice (1919)
Aleister Crowley's Hymn to Lucifer (1919)
Aleister Crowley's Liber Samekh
E. Hoffmann Price's The Stranger From Kurdistan (1925)
Sylvia Townsend Warner's Lolly Willowes (1926)
Frederic Arnold Kummer's Ladies in Hades (1928)
Carl Heinrich's Orphan of Eternity (1929)
Theodora Du Bois' The Devil's Spoon (1930)
Sherard Vines' Return, Belphegor! (1932)
William Gerhardie's Memoirs of Satan (1932, reprint edition by Faber and Faber, 2011. )
John Collier's The Devil and All (1934)
 "Murray Constantine's" (Katharine Burdekin) The Devil, Poor Devil! (1934)
Stephen Vincent Benét's The Devil and Daniel Webster (1937)
C. S. Lewis's The Screwtape Letters (1942)
Alfred Bester's Hell is Forever (1942)
Lord Dunsany's A Deal With the Devil (1946)
Thomas Mann's Doktor Faustus (1947)
James Branch Cabell's The Devil's Own Dear Son (1949)
David H. Keller's The Devil and the Doctor (1949)
George Ivanovich Gurdjieff's An Objectively Impartial Criticism of the Life of Man or Beelzebub's Tales to His Grandson: volume one of the All and Everything trilogy (1950)
Robert Nathan's The Innocent Eve 1951
William Golding's Lord of the Flies (1954)
Douglass Wallop's The Year the Yankees Lost the Pennant (1954) -- source of the musical and film Damn Yankees
Alfred Noyes' The Devil Takes a Holiday (1955)
Basil Davenport, Deals With the Devil (anthology) (1958)
Robert Bloch's That Hell-Bound Train (1959)
Arthur Calder-Marshall's The Fair to Middling (1959)
Muriel Spark's The Ballad of Peckham Rye (1960)
Mikhail Bulgakov's The Master and Margarita (1966)
William Peter Blatty's The Exorcist (1971)
Harlan Ellison's The Deathbird (1974)
Natalie Babbitt's The Devil's Storybook (1974)
J.R.R. Tolkien's The Silmarillion (1977)
Michael Moorcock's The War Hound and the World's Pain (1981)
Jeremy Leven's Satan (1982)
Margit Sandemo's The Legend of the Ice People series (1982-1989)
Piers Anthony's Incarnations of Immortality series (1983–1990) 	
Robert A. Heinlein's Job: A Comedy of Justice (1984)
Cormac McCarthy's Blood Meridian (1985)
Isaac Asimov's Magical Worlds of Fantasy #8: Devils, an anthology of 18 fantasy short stories edited by Isaac Asimov, Martin H. Greenburg, and Charles Waugh (1987)
Robert R. McCammon's Swan Song (1987)
Neil Gaiman and Terry Pratchett's Good Omens (1990)
Stephen King's "The Man in the Black Suit" (1994)
Philip Pullman's His Dark Materials (1995)
Tim LaHaye and Jerry B. Jenkins's Left Behind series (1995–2007) 	
Anne Rice's Memnoch the Devil (1996)
Michael Swanwick's Jack Faust (1997)
Andrew W. Marlowe's The End of Days (1999)
Steven Brust's To Reign in Hell: A Novel (2000)
Eoin Colfer's The Wish List (2000)
Jeri Smith-Ready's Requiem for the Devil (2001)
David Weber and John Ringo's Empire of Man (2001–2005)
John A. De Vito's The Devil's Apocrypha (2002)
Sherrilyn Kenyon's Dark-Hunter series (2002–present)
Anne Bishop's The Black Jewels (2003)
Glen Duncan's I, Lucifer (2003)
Catherine Webb's Waywalkers (2003)
Thomas E. Sniegoski's The Fallen (2003-2004)
Bryan Davis's Dragons In Our Midst (2004-2005)
Bryan Davis's Oracles of Fire (2006-2009)
Melissa De La Cruz's Blue Bloods series (2006-2013)
James Robertson's The Testament of Gideon Mack (2006)
Sean Vincent Lehosit's Lucifer and Lacious (2007)
Jeff Rovin's Conversations with the Devil (2007)
Robert Seger's The Father of All Lies (2009)
Lauren Kate's Fallen series (2009-2012)
Richard Kadrey's Sandman Slim series (2009-2021)
Joe Hill's Horns (2010)
Aiden Truss's Gape (2013)
Kat Daemon's Taming Darkness (2014)
Clive Barker's The Scarlet Gospels (2015)
Tony Vilgotsky's Shepherd of the Dead (2018)
Liminality Mythos's The World Reached (2021)
Wingless Wurm's L1M's Logs from Metamorphosis (2022)

Comics
In DC and Vertigo comics, the Devil is represented by Lucifer "Samael" Morningstar, the Fallen Angel, former ruler of Hell, and leader of the Unholy Trinity - although other figures, such as Neron and the First of the Fallen, sometimes portray the devil. It is the same Lucifer Morningstar from the Netflix series Lucifer. In Underworld Unleashed, Neron gives enhanced powers to numerous supervillains. Darkseid is also associated with the Devil in the forms of Lucifer, Hades, the Greek God of the underworld, and the Hindu goddess Kali.

In some Marvel Comics publications, a "Lucifer" has been mentioned as being a Hell-lord with the same "fallen from Heaven" backstory. In the Ghost Rider series, Johnny Blaze faces a demon who claims to be Lucifer. In other Marvel plotlines, several high-level demons, such as Mephisto, Azazel, Marduk Kurios, and Satannish, have claimed to be the biblical Satan. In Marvel Comics, the Norse trickster-god Loki is shown as the main adversary of his adopted brother Thor and a common enemy of both Earth and Asgard. Although Loki has conjured up somewhat demonic magic, he is not a demon, but a misshapen frost giant. Among the characters related to Norse mythology, the fire giant Surtur is more reminiscent of a demon. The Egyptian demon-god Seth and the Japanese demon-god Amatsu-Mikaboshi have Satan-like roles in Marvel Comics.

Satan is a main character in the manga Devilman by Go Nagai.

Jio Freed, the main character from the manga, O-Parts Hunter, contains Satan, the most powerful demon in the series.

In the manga series Bastard‼: Heavy Metal, Dark Fantasy by Kazushi Hagiwara, Satan appears as a large monster that has destroyed the Milky Way Galaxy by flying across it. Satan also helps Dark Schneider by telling him that he is a major part of the end times prophecy, who will lead demons and mankind to war against God and his army.

In the Image Comics comic book series Spawn, Satan is depicted as the twin brother of God. Both God and Satan are depicted as having squandered their powers as creator gods in endless fighting and were punished for it by the Mother of Creation. In the resurrection one shot and the later issues, God was now more benevolent and less hostile while Satan was still the Supreme ruler  of Hell and the third primary antagonist of the series the first being Malebolgia and the second being Mammon.

The title character of Johnny the Homicidal Maniac is sent to Hell and has an extensive conversation with Señor Diablo (Spanish for Mr. Devil). In the spinoff series Squee!, the Devil is married to a Christian woman and has a son, Pepito the Antichrist, who befriends the unwilling Squee. Squee is invited to Satan's house for dinner, where Satan and Pepito both try to get Squee to join them, but he refuses and leaves after finishing dinner.

Satan is the main character in Normal Bob Smith's satirical Satan's Salvation.

In the manga series Blue Exorcist by Kazue Kato, the main character, Rin Okumura, is Satan's son and emits blue flames, a sign of Satan. His twin, Yukio, is also a son of Satan, but does not bear the flames.

Lucifer appears in the Saint Seiya anime and manga series.

Video games

Satan also appears as the main antagonist in Night Schools side-scrolling adventure video game Afterparty, he is referred to by the names Lucifer, "Luc", Satan and Morning Star and is portrayed as a more laid-back, party enjoying entity.
Lucifer is portrayed as a game developer in the 2016 metafictional video game Pony Island, who has been trapping players' souls inside the game.
The Dark Prince (known as Satan in Japan) is a green-haired demon that serves as the comical villain in the Puyo Puyo series.
Satan is the main antagonist and final boss in Castlevania: Lords of Shadow. He appears as a long-haired, nearly naked man.
Satan returns as the main antagonist in the sequel Castlevania: Lords of Shadow 2.
Satan is the name of one of the Seven Sisters of Purgatory in the series Umineko: When They Cry.
In the Megami Tensei series, Lucifer, Satan, and Beelzebub appear as separate entities.
Lucifer first appeared in 1987's Digital Devil Story: Megami Tensei as the game's final boss. He appears throughout the series as a Chaos-aligned character. He also has a human avatar named Louis Cyphre that takes the form of either a child, a young man, an elderly man, or, in Louisa Ferre's case, a woman. He is shown as an enemy of Satan and YHVH. He also appears in the Devil Survivor spin-off, as one of the most powerful monsters in the game. In Shin Megami Tensei IV, Lucifer is the final boss of the Law and Neutral paths, opposing Merkabah.
In Shin Megami Tensei: Devil Children Light & Dark Versions, there exists a parody of Lucifer named LuciFroz (also known as Lucifrost and Lucifer Frost). LuciFroz is a Jack Frost demon that impersonated Lucifer to gain power. Afterwards, he tried to join Lucifer's ranks but was unsuccessful due to Lucifer's absence from Hell.
The Persona video game series depicts three separate versions of Lucifer. The seraphim version of Lucifer is known as Helel while the demonic version is known as Lucifer. A third variation of Lucifer appears in Persona 5 under the name Satanael, the form of Lucifer before his fall from Heaven. This variation differs from Helel.
Satan first appeared in 1990's Digital Devil Story: Megami Tensei II as one of the game's final bosses. Often a law aligned character, Satan serves YHVH as the accuser. Serving an important role in Shin Megami Tensei II, Satan is tasked to bring judgement to those not worthy of the Millennium Kingdom. Shin Megami Tensei IV: Apocalypse based Satan off his appearance in the Book of Revelation while older entries used the Hebrew Bible's interpretation of Ha-Satan for his design.
Satan frequently appears in the Persona video game series as a high-ranking member of the Judgement arcana.
The Ghosts 'n Goblins series have a recurring motif thorough the series in which main characters in each game uses a name given to the biblical Satan, although they are all different characters. In Ghouls 'n Ghosts, the character is named Lucifer. The character was renamed Loki in the international versions of the Sega Genesis port and Rushifell (a misromanization of Lucifer) in Gargoyle's Quest.
In El Shaddai: Ascension of the Metatron, Lucifer (referred to as Lucifel) assists Enoch in his battle against the fallen angels. Lucifel is portrayed as a wisecracking trickster like character who shares a comical, friendly relationship with God.
In Dante's Inferno, Lucifer appears as a shadowy spirit at the start before Dante Allighieri faces him in his physical form, only to be revealed as a shell-like imprisonment that holds the real Lucifer: a malformed angel with his wings ripped off, having been banished from Paradise after his failed rebellion against the Creator. It is revealed that he needs Dante to free him so he can have his revenge on God, but ultimately fails, and is sealed back into his icy prison by the holy power of Dante's cross, combined with every single soul that Dante absolved in Hell.Devil May Cry 4 features a demonic weapon known as Lucifer that Dante obtains after he kills Berial. The weapon is depicted as a skull holding a rose in its mouth. The weapon is capable of firing infinite explosive mini-swords.
In Guitar Hero III: Legends of Rock, Lucifer (under the alias of Lou) is shown as a manager for the player's band. It is later revealed that the band inadvertently sold their souls to him.
In Onimusha: Dawn of Dreams, the character Roberto Frois uses gauntlets featuring the names of several archangels of Abrahamic myth with the Lucifer Gauntlets being his strongest darkness based weapon.
In Mega Man X8, the character Lumine is based on Lucifer, and includes a final attack called Paradise Lost.
He makes an appearance as the King of Dem in the video game series DemiKids.
Lucifer appears in the Painkiller video game series, where he is shown as a classical red demon.
Lucifer appears in Rage of Bahamut as both an Archangel, called a Seraph, and a Fallen Angel. His Fallen Angel form is the most prominent portrayal of him. Satan also makes an appearance as a separate entity.
Lucifer and Satan appear in Granblue Fantasy as separate entities, but they are connected as Lucifer holds the seal that keeps Satan (renamed “Black Beast”) from terrorizing the world. 
Lucifer also appears as a secret boss in Final Fantasy II in the palace of Arubboth.
The devil is the final boss in Tekken 2. In the following games of Tekken, the character of Jin Kazama has an alter ego and alternative playable character Devil Jin, who is an inheritor of his father Kazuya's Devil Gene. In the game series, the "Devil" is described as a curse, rather than a single evil entity.
Lucifer, or alternatively, "Doom Bringer", is a playable character in Defense of the Ancients.
In Monster Retsuden Oreca Battle, there is a card called Fallen Angel Lucifer, as well as her false form Lucif.
Many forms of the Devil appear in the mobile game Puzzle & Dragons, as Satan, who can be obtained only in its Descended-tier Dungeon "Lord of Hell - Mythical", and can evolve into Satan, King of the Underworld, and then "Ultimate Evolve" into King of Hell, Satan. Lucifer is available in the Archangel and Fallen Angel flavors. Also Mephistopheles has recently been added to the game.
Satan appears in the roguelike game The Binding Of Isaac, and its remake, The Binding Of Isaac: Rebirth. In the game, you can, if you don't take damage in a level, deal with him, sacrificing some of your health in exchange for items. He can also be fought as a boss in the game, not only in his regular form, but also as mega satan.
Satan, referred to as "The Devil" appears as the main antagonist in the game Cuphead, and as the final boss, as well as the owner of the Inkwell Hell casino. Unlike other depictions, he has no wings, and is depicted as a large, imposing, furry demon, with horns, and a trident.
In the game Genshin Impact, one of the element ruling Archons' name is Beelzebul (variant of Beelzebub). She is also the God of Eternity.
Satan appears in Broforce as the main antagonist. In the game's story, Satan is the boss of the terrorists trying to take over the United States, and appears at the end of most levels, though he can be easily defeated in a single blow. When the Xenomorphs attack America and infect the country, Satan and the terrorists put their plans for world domination on hold until they're defeated, where Satan becomes more powerful, with an undead army of terrorists and is then the final boss when he unlocks his true potential. However, he's defeated and Rambro eventually pees on his grave after the visit to the White House. There are two Trophies regarding killing Satan two different ways with The Brode and Brommando. 
Lucifer appears in the game Helltaker as the CEO of Hell
In Hades by Supergiant Games, the fourth and final aspect for the Adamant Rail is the Aspect of Lucifer.

Role-playing games
Lucifer appears in the White Wolf role-playing game Demon: The Fallen and less extensively in Vampire: The Masquerade. In it, he rebelled against God to save humans from Oblivion by enlightening them.
Satan appears in the SJ Games role-playing game GURPS Casey and Andy. In it, she (in the form of Frances Cleveland) attempts to seduce her older self's early-2000s boyfriend after he travels back in time to the 1800s to meet her when she had taken the form of Cleveland, both unaware of the other's relationship to one another in different times, bringing her to the present, while her 1800s-era husband, Grover Cleveland, follows in pursuit with a time machine of his own, reclaiming the position of President of the United States in the present.

The Devil's Dictionary

Ambrose Bierce's The Devil's Dictionary gives a satirical view of Satan as "one of the Creator's lamentable mistakes". When expelled from Heaven, he asks that mankind be allowed to make its own laws, and the request is granted.

Legal matters
In 1971, Gerald Mayo brought a civil rights action in the United States District Court for the Western District of Pennsylvania against Satan and his servants, who allegedly placed deliberate obstacles in Mayo's path. In its written opinion, the Court did not deny Satan's existence, but asserted that it was unlikely that Satan was ever present in the Western District of Pennsylvania, stating, "We question whether plaintiff may obtain personal jurisdiction over the defendant in this judicial district."

In a jocular reference to The Devil and Daniel Webster, the court implied that Satan might live in New Hampshire, stating, "While the official reports disclose no case where this defendant has appeared as defendant there is an unofficial account of a trial in New Hampshire where this defendant filed an action of mortgage foreclosure as plaintiff." This appears to be the only published legal case in the U.S. concerning Satan, thus the present U.S. official position seems to be that Satan may exist and, if so, might be found in New Hampshire.

In Sweden, at least four people have had their application to use the name Lucifer rejected, either to change their legal name or to name their child, because the Swedish Tax Agency considered the name to be "strongly associated with the Devil or Satan and therefore capable of causing offence". Names that, among other things, can cause offence, cannot be chosen according to naming law in Sweden.

See also
 I Am The Beast etc. v. Michigan State Police
 List of fictional demons
 Trigon
 Satan (disambiguation)
 Works based on Faust
 Deal with the Devil

References

 Further reading The Comics Go to Hell: A Visual History of the Devil in Comics (by Fredrik Stromberg, 360 pages, Fantagraphics Books, 2005)The Lure of the Dark Side: Satan & Western Demonology in Popular Culture (by Eric S. Christianson and Christopher Patridge, 256 pages, Equinox Publishing Ltd, SW11, 2008)
 The Satanic Screen: An Illustrated Guide to the Devil in Cinema (by Nikolas Schreck, 256 pages, Creation Books, 2001)

 External links 

Lucifer character  at IMDb
Thirty-two years of Satan in popular culture, SF Weekly''.

Demons in popular culture
Lists of songs about a topic
Literature lists
Satan
Fictional violinists
The Devil in classical music
Fiction about the Devil
Christianity in popular culture